Theo Jay Wharton (born 15 November 1994) is a footballer who plays as a midfielder for Cymru Premier club Barry Town United and the  Saint Kitts and Nevis national team.

Early and personal life
Wharton was born in Cwmbran, Torfaen, and is the son of former footballer Sean Wharton and godson of former footballer Nathan Blake.

Club career

Early career
Wharton played for Pontypool-based side Race Juniors and helped the team to Tesco Cup final at the City of Manchester Stadium.

Cardiff City

Wharton started his career at Cardiff City, playing for their under-18 side during the 2011–12 season. His impressive form for the youth team resulted in a first-team call up by manager Malky Mackay for the FA Cup game against West Bromwich Albion, in which he came on as a substitute. Following his debut, Mackay admitted that Wharton would train with first team and had a "big future ahead of him". On 29 March 2012, Wharton signed his first professional contract which would keep at Cardiff until at least June 2014.

Wharton joined National League South club Weston-super-Mare on 23 March 2017 on loan.

York City and Nuneaton Borough
Wharton signed for newly relegated National League North club York City on 30 June 2017 on a one-year contract. He joined York's divisional rivals Tamworth on 22 December 2017 on a one-month loan. Tamworth's attempts to extend his loan for the rest of the season were unsuccessful, and he finished his spell at the club with four appearances. Wharton made nine appearances for York as they finished 2017–18 in 11th place in the table. He was released at the end of the season.

Wharton signed for National League North club Nuneaton Borough in July 2018.

Hereford
Wharton signed for National League North club Hereford on 22 December 2018.

Barry Town United
Wharton signed for Cymru Premier club Barry Town United on 13 January 2020.

International career
Wharton was first selected for the Wales national under-17 team for the 2011 UEFA European Under-17 Championship qualifying round, starting two matches against Belgium and Denmark. Wharton was called up to the Wales under-21 team to play Moldova on 22 March 2013. On 9 September 2014, Wharton made his Wales under-21 debut in a 1–1 draw against Lithuania under-21s.

In 2016, Wharton chose to switch allegiance to play for Saint Kitts and Nevis, the country where his grandparents were born. He made his debut for the side on 13 November 2016 in a 2–0 defeat to Haiti.

Career statistics

Club

International

As of match played 14 October 2018. Saint Kitts and Nevis score listed first, score column indicates score after each Wharton goal.

References

External links

Profile at the Nuneaton Borough F.C. website

1994 births
Living people
Footballers from Cwmbran
Welsh footballers
Wales youth international footballers
Wales under-21 international footballers
Saint Kitts and Nevis footballers
Saint Kitts and Nevis international footballers
Association football midfielders
Cardiff City F.C. players
Weston-super-Mare A.F.C. players
York City F.C. players
Tamworth F.C. players
Nuneaton Borough F.C. players
Barry Town United F.C. players
National League (English football) players
Welsh people of Saint Kitts and Nevis descent
Cymru Premier players